MOSCED (short for “modified separation of cohesive energy density" model) is a thermodynamic model for the estimation of limiting activity coefficients (also known as activity coefficient at infinite dilution). From a historical point of view MOSCED can be regarded as an improved modification of the Hansen method and the Hildebrand solubility model by adding higher interaction term such as polarity, induction and separation of hydrogen bonding terms. This allows the prediction of polar and associative compounds, which most solubility parameter models have been found to do poorly. In addition to making quantitative prediction, MOSCED can be used to understand fundamental molecular level interaction for intuitive solvent selection and formulation.

In addition to infinite dilution, MOSCED can be used to parameterize excess Gibbs Free Energy model such as NRTL, WILSON, Mod-UNIFAC to map out Vapor Liquid Equilibria of mixture. This was demonstrated briefly by Schriber and Eckert  using infinite dilution data to parameterize WILSON equation.

The first publication is from 1984 and a major revision of parameters has been done 2005. This revised version is described here.

Basic principle 

MOSCED uses component-specific parameters describing electronic properties of a compound. These five properties are partly derived from experimental values and partly fitted to experimental data. In addition to the five electronic properties the model uses the molar volume for every component.

These parameters are then entered in several equations to obtain the limiting activity coefficient of an infinitely diluted solute in a solvent. These equations have further parameters which have been found empirically.

The authors found an average absolute deviation of 10.6% against their database of experimental data. The database contains limiting activity coefficients of binary systems of non-polar, polar and hydrogen compounds, but no water. As can be seen in the deviation chart, the systems with water deviate significantly.

Due to such huge deviation of water as solute  as seen in the chart, new water parameters are regressed to improve results. All the data for regression were taking from Yaws Handbook of Properties for Aqueous System. Using the old water parameter, for water in organics, Root Mean Square Deviation(RMSD)  for ln (γ∞)  was found to be around 2.864%  and Average Absolute Error(AAE) for (γ∞)  around 3056.2 %. That is a significant error which might explain the deviation as seen from the graph. The revised water parameters can be found in the table below titled "Revised water".

Equations 

 

 

 

 ,
 ,
 

 

 

 

with

Important note: The value 3.4 in the equation for ξ is different from the value 3.24 in the original publication. The 3.24 has been verified to be a typing error.

The activity coefficient of the solute and solvent can be extended to other concentrations by applying the principle of the Margules equation. This gives:

 

 

where

 

is the volume fraction and  the mole fraction of compound i.
The activity coefficient of the solvent is calculated with same equations, but interchanging indices 1 and 2.

Model parameters
The model uses five component specific properties to characterize the interaction forces between a solute and its solvent. Some of these properties are derived from other known component properties and some are fitted to experimental data obtained from data banks.

Liquid molar volume 
The molar liquid volume ν is given in cm³/mol and assumed to be temperature-independent.

Dispersion parameter 
The dispersion parameter λ describes the polarizability of a molecule.

Polarity parameter 
The polarity parameter τ describes the fixed dipole of a molecule.

Induction parameter 
The induction parameter q describes the effects of induced dipoles (induced by fixed dipoles).
For structures with an aromatic ring the value is set to 0.9, for aliphatic rings and chains this value is set on 1. 
For some compounds the q-parameter is optimized between 0.9 and 1 (e.g. hexene, octene).

Acidity and basicity parameters
These parameters describe the effects of hydrogen-bonding during solving and association.

Parameter table

References

Further reading

External links 
 Online Calculation of limiting activity coefficients with MOSCED
 Desktop Application for MOSCED property calculations. https://sites.google.com/view/mosced

Thermodynamic models